Abbasabad-e Hajji (also Romanized as ‘Abbāsābād-e Ḩājjī; also known as ‘Abbāsābād and ‘Abbāsābād-e Ḩājjī Āqā‘alī) is a village in Qasemabad Rural District, in the Central District of Rafsanjan County, Kerman Province, Iran. At the 2006 census, its population was 2,086, in 516 families.

References 

Populated places in Rafsanjan County